Stempfferia coerulea is a butterfly in the family Lycaenidae. It is found in Cameroon, the Republic of the Congo, the Central African Republic and the Democratic Republic of the Congo.

Subspecies
Stempfferia coerulea coerulea (Congo, Democratic Republic of the Congo)
Stempfferia coerulea pierri Libert, 1999 (Cameroon, Central African Republic)

References

Butterflies described in 1962
Poritiinae